Stars Over Foy is a Dutch ambient music producer with Australian descent. 3 of his releases entered the World Chill Lounge Charts in April 2016.

History

Stars Over Foy was founded in 2015 to create relaxation, meditation and sleep music for the audio CD series World of Ambient by Swiss based radio station Planet Ambi HD Radio.

The first World of Ambient CD was released on December 3, 2015. Followed by World of Ambient Part II on February 29, 2016.

"Until We Meet Again In Heaven" and "Don't Run To The River" (both part of World of Ambient) and At The End Of The Ocean (part of World of Ambient Part II) charted in the World Chill Lounge Charts at the same time in week 16 of 2016.

Guiding Bells a track that he composed with Dr. J. James and released on Planet Ambi entered the WCC Charts on May 2, 2016 at #37.

In April 2016, he released "The Dreamship" a music CD with the focus on sleep.

In June, he released his CD album "Mirror of Emotions" and in September "Outrunning The Darkness" with his new Stars Over Foy presents Art of Drone project.

In September 2016, he launched his podcast named "World of Ambient Podcast" in where he plays a dj mix featuring drone and ambient music.

September 2017, he released a new CD album in the Planet Ambi Presents World of Ambient Part III series.

His radio show and podcast "World of Ambient" have been broadcast on Di.fm since October 2017.

His track Pacific taken from his album "World of Ambient Part III' reached the number 2 position of the World Chill Charts in week 52 of 2017.

In 2018, he released his first mix album "The Ambient Files" on his own new label "Ambient Files". For this album he works together with artists such as Bvdub, Vechigen, Hirotaka Shirotsubaki, Alonefold, and Blank Embrace.

Discography

CD Albums

 2015 – Planet Ambi Presents World Of Ambient (Music For Relaxation) (Planet Ambi)
 2016 – Planet Ambi Presents World Of Ambient Part II (Music For Relaxation) (Planet Ambi)
 2016 – The Dreamship (Music For Deep Sleep) (Planet Ambi)
 2016 – Mirror Of Emotions (Planet Ambi)
 2016 – Outrunning The Darkness (Planet Ambi)
 2016 – Kurama (with Nagayaki Hushimo) (Planet Ambi)
 2017 – Planet Ambi Presents World of Ambient Part III (Planet Ambi)
 2018 – The Ambient Files mixed by Stars Over Foy (Ambient Files)
 2019 – The Ambient Files, Part 2 mixed by Stars Over Foy (Ambient Files)

Digital Singles

 2016 – At The End Of The Ocean (Planet Ambi)
 2016 – Guiding Bells (with Dr. J. James) (Planet Ambi)
 2016 – Here For You (with Dr. J. James as S.O.F.) (Planet Ambi)
 2016 – Until We Meet Again In Heaven (Vechigen Chillout Remix) (Planet Ambi)
 2016 – Spring Garden (with Vienna Sky) (Planet Ambi)
 2016 – 15 Minutes of Silence (Ambient Online)
 2016 – Alien Takeover (Ambient Online)
 2016 – Endless Flight Across The Sea Of Stars (Planet Ambi)
 2017 – Never Look Back (Planet Ambi)
 2017 – Moust à Ché (part of Ambient Movember MMXVII)
 2018 – Pacific (Ambient Online)
 2018 – Want To Leave This World (Into Space) (with Vechigen) (Ambient Files)
 2018 – Atlantic / Pacific (Planet Ambi)
 2019 – Vechigen - We Are You (Stars Over Foy Soundscapes Mix) (Divergent Industry)
 2019 – Until Infinity (with vienna Sky) (Planet Ambi)
 2019 – Empty Places (with Robert Woodfield) (Divergent Industry)
 2019 – Mirror of Emotions (Ambi Nature Mix) (Planet Ambi)

Discography Hit Quotation Singles

Trivia

 Stars Over Foy wears a mask or face cover during most live shows and on press photos.
 He is member of the Chill-out music group Vechigen that is signed to the famous Bonzai Music label from Belgium.
 Supports the Swiss football club FC Basel 1893 and Dutch AZ Alkmaar
 Owns a German Shepherd named Rex The Raptor with his own instagram account

References

External links
 

World of Ambient Website
Planet Ambi Website 
World of Ambient Podcast

Australian electronic musicians
Dutch electronic musicians
Dutch record producers
New-age musicians
Ambient musicians
Living people
Musicians from Rotterdam
Dutch people of Australian descent
Dutch radio personalities
Year of birth missing (living people)